Marshland is an unincorporated community located in the town of Buffalo, in Buffalo County, Wisconsin, United States.

History
The La Crosse, Trempealeau & Prescott Railroad chartered to build from a point across the river from Winona to connect with the Chicago, Milwaukee and St. Paul railroad at Winona Junction in Wisconsin near La Crosse. This was completed in 1870 with tracks in Marshland.

The Green Bay & Minnesota Railroad laid tracks from Merrillian Junction to join with the La Crosse, Trempealeau, & Prescott Railroad at Marshland in 1873. That railroad was built to reach Winona, Minnesota and the Winona and St. Peter Railroad. This became part of the Green Bay and Western Railroad.

A post office called Marshland was established in 1875, and remained in operation until it was discontinued in 1904. The community was named from the fact adjacent farmland was once a marsh.

References

Unincorporated communities in Buffalo County, Wisconsin
Unincorporated communities in Wisconsin